東京 may refer to:
, the capital of Japan
Tokyo (disambiguation)
Đông Kinh (東京), a former name of Hanoi, Vietnam
Tonkin, a part of Vietnam
Tonkin (disambiguation)
Dongjing (disambiguation) (東京) in Chinese
Luoyang
Kaifeng

See also
Eastern Capital (disambiguation)